Starmind is an AI software company based in Zürich, Switzerland. The Starmind software builds custom knowledge networks within large organizations to connect employees with the information and knowledge they're looking for in real-time.

Product & Technology
The Starmind software was developed with the intention to provide employees answers from top experts within their company, on any subject. The Software uses self-learning algorithms to build company expertise networks.

These algorithms use neuroscientific principles, such as Hebbian Learning. Founder Pascal Kaufmann has stated his goal is to create machines which work like the human brain.

The software identifies experts within a network and connects them to employees in need of that expertise via a text based interface.

History 
Starmind was founded by Pascal Kaufmann and Marc Vontobel at the Artificial Intelligence Laboratory at the University of Zurich in 2010. The algorithm was developed using insights from Artificial Intelligence and neuroscientific research from the Swiss Federal Institute of Technology (ETH) in Zurich and is based on virtual neural tissue and self-learning neural networks studies.
In 2012, Siemens Awarded Starmind with the title “company to watch”,  which resulted in extensive media coverage.
In 2013, Starmind was nominated for various awards in Switzerland as well as abroad.

Offices
Starmind has offices in Switzerland, Germany and the United States of America. The company is headquartered in Küsnacht, Switzerland.

References

Software companies of Switzerland
Companies based in Zürich
Swiss companies established in 2010